Vyacheslav Strakhov (born 13 January 1950) is a Soviet former diver who competed in the 1972 Summer Olympics and in the 1976 Summer Olympics.

References

External links
 
Profile at Infosport.ru 

1950 births
Living people
Divers from Moscow
Soviet male divers
Olympic divers of the Soviet Union
Divers at the 1972 Summer Olympics
Divers at the 1976 Summer Olympics
Universiade medalists in diving
Universiade gold medalists for the Soviet Union
Medalists at the 1973 Summer Universiade
World Aquatics Championships medalists in diving